Adelbert "Del" St. John (October 6, 1931 – December 18, 2009) was a Canadian-Austrian professional ice hockey player.

St. John, a forward, scored 17 goals and 16 assists in 31 games for the Nottingham Panthers of the British National League.

He played the 1958-9 season in Serie A in Italy with HC Bolzano, and he played the 1960-61 season in Austria for Klagenfurter AC.

International
St. John competed as a member of the Austria men's national ice hockey team at the 1964 and 1968 Winter Olympic Games.

References

External sources

1931 births
2009 deaths
Austrian ice hockey players
Austrian people of Canadian descent
Bolzano HC players
British National League (1954–1960) players
Canadian expatriate ice hockey players in Austria
Canadian expatriate ice hockey players in England
Canadian expatriate ice hockey players in Italy
Canadian ice hockey forwards
EC KAC players
Ice hockey people from Alberta
Ice hockey players at the 1964 Winter Olympics
Ice hockey players at the 1968 Winter Olympics
Naturalised citizens of Austria
Nottingham Panthers players
Olympic ice hockey players of Austria
Serie A (ice hockey) players